Events from the year 1407 in France

Incumbents
 Monarch – Charles VI

Events
 20 November - A truce is agreed between the warring nobles John the Fearless, Duke of Burgundy and Louis I, Duke of Orléans 
 23 November - The Duke of Orleans is assassinated by adherents of the Duke of Burgundy leading to continued conflict between the factions
 Unknown - Construction is completed on the Nyons Bridge over the River Eygues

Births
 Unknown - Marguerite, bâtarde de France, noblewoman (died 1458)

Deaths
 23 November - Louis I, Duke of Orléans, brother of Charles VI (born 1372)

References

1400s in France